A denga was a Russian monetary unit with a value latterly equal to ½ kopeck (100 kopecks = 1 Russian ruble).

Production of dengas as minted coins began in the middle of the 14th century. In their earliest form they were imitations of the silver coinage of the khans of the Golden Horde, usually bearing blundered or meaningless legends. Weighing about a gram, they were prepared by cutting silver wire into measured lengths, beating each length flat, and then striking the resulting blank between two dies. This resulted in slightly elongated coins, often showing traces of the original wire from which they had been taken. From Dmitry Donskoy's time onwards the coins began to take a more Russian form, with depictions of people, animals and Russian legends, although legends partly in Arabic (the official language of the Horde) persisted on some coins until the time of Ivan III.

Dengas were made only in the southern Russian principalities; the state of Novgorod and the City of Pskov made their own slightly larger coins. In 1535, a reform took place, with the northern "novgorodka" being valued at twice the southern denga or "moskovka". In the 1540s novgorodkas depicting a horseman with a spear (Russian копьё (kop'yo)) began to be made, and novgorodkas were thenceforth known as kopecks.

The minting of silver dengas seems to have decreased after the 16th century, as they are found less often in hoards, but they are known until the reign of Peter the Great. By that time the coinage had devalued so far that dengas weighed only about 0.14 grams, and were of little practical use. In the coinage reform of 1700 they reappeared as much larger copper coins, and mintage continued, off and on, until 1916, just before the Romanov dynasty ended in 1917.

Coins minted in the 18th century invariably showed the denomination as Denga, but during parts of the 19th century this was replaced by the word Denezhka, the diminutive form of Denga. Later still the denomination was shown simply as ½ Kopeck.

The plural form of Denga, den'gi (деньги) has become the usual Russian word for 'money'.

Etymology
The Russian word denga is borrowed from Tatar (cf. Chagatay: täŋkä; ;). Other proposals made are: Middle Persian: dāng, New Persian: dānag ('coin'), whereas other authors saw the word close to the Turkic word tamga ('mark, stamp').

Post-reform silver denga mintage
 Ivan IV (1535–1584)
 Feodor I (1584–1594)
 Michael (1613–1645)
 Alexis (1645–1655, 1663–1676)
 Feodor III (1676–1682)
 Ivan V (during joint rule with Peter the Great) (1683–1696)
 Peter the Great (includes joint rule with Ivan V) (1683–1717)

Silver dengas were not minted during the last years of Feodor I's rule, nor during the Time of Troubles, though silver wire kopecks were minted throughout this period, including emissions by imposters and invaders.

Copper denga mintage

During the time of Peter the Great, dengas transitioned from silver to copper, and from undated to Byzantine dates in Cyrillic to Julian dates in Cyrillic.  After Peter's reign, dates were denoted using the common notation of Arabic numerals.

 Alexis (1654–1663, production ended in the aftermath of the Copper riot)
 Peter the Great (1700–1718)
 Anna Ioannovna (1730–1731, 1734–1740)
 Ivan VI of Russia (1741)
 Elizabeth Petrovna (1743–1754, 1757–1760)
 Peter III of Russia (1762)
 Catherine II of Russia (1764, 1766–1775, 1783–1796)
 Paul I of Russia (1797–1801)

(19th Century mintage to follow)

References

Literature 
Узденников В. Монеты России (1700—1917): Издание третье. — М.: Collector's Books; IP Media Inc., 2004.

External links
 Kopek, denga, polushka: An English-language guide to Russian wire money
 Examples of some 16th-century dengas at metaldetectingworld.com

Coins of Russia